Upsherin, Upsheren, Opsherin or Upsherinish (Yiddish: אפשערן, lit. "shear off", Judaeo-Arabic: חלאקה, ḥalāqah) is a haircutting ceremony observed by a wide cross-section of Jews and is particularly popular in Haredi Jewish communities. It is typically held when a boy turns three years old. Among those who practise the upsherin, the male infant does not have his hair cut until this ceremony.

Background 
The upsherin tradition is a relatively modern custom in Judaism and has only become a popular practice since the 17th century.

Yoram Bilu, a professor of anthropology and psychology at the Hebrew University of Jerusalem, suggests that there is little or no religious basis for the custom and its popularity is probably mainly social. The following are some quotes from his paper,

Two disparate hair-related practices appear to have converged in the haircutting ritual: the growing of ear-locks payoth – s.d.] and the shearing of the head hair. ... Ritual haircut, probably modeled on the Muslim custom of shaving male children's hair in saints' sanctuaries, was practiced by native Palestinian Jews (Musta'arbim) as early as the Middle Ages. Rabbi Isaac Luria Ashkenazi, the 16th-century founder of the celebrated Lurianic School of Kabbalah who assigned special mystical value to the ear-locks, was instrumental in constituting the ritual in its present form. The ritual remained primarily a Sephardi custom following Luria, but in the last 200 years it became widespread among East European Hasidim. From Palestine it spread to the Diaspora communities, where it was usually celebrated in a more modest family setting.

Rabbi Chaim Vital wrote in Sha'ar Ha-Kavanot that "Isaac Luria, cut his son's hair on Lag BaOmer, according to the well-known custom." However, the age of his son is not mentioned. An obvious problem raised by Avraham Yaari, in an article in Tarbiẕ 22 (1951), is that many sources cite that Luria held one should not cut one's hair for the entire sefirah – including Lag BaOmer, (see Shaarei Teshuva, O.C. 493, 8).

We know from travellers that by the 18th and 19th centuries, the hilula at Meron on Lag BaOmer with bonfires and the cutting of children's hair had by then become an affair of the masses. A well-known Talmud scholar from Bulgaria, Rabbi Abraham ben Israel Rosanes, wrote that, in his visit to Palestine in 1867, he saw an Ashkenazi Jew giving his son a haircut at the hilula. Rosanes says that he could not restrain himself, and went to the Jew and tried to dissuade him, yet was unsuccessful; he also complained that most of the Ashkenazi and Sephardi Jews of Israel were participating in this "insanity," with "drinking and dancing and fires."

A Hasidic rebbe, Rabbi Yehudah Leibush Horenstein, who emigrated to Palestine in the middle of the 19th century, writes that "this haircut, called halaqe, is done by the Sephardim in Jerusalem at the tomb of Rabbi Shimon bar Yochai during the summer, but during the winter they take the boy to the synagogue or Beit Midrash and perform the haircut with great celebration and parties, something unknown to the Jews in Europe."

Customs 

In the Hasidic community, the upsherin marks a male child's entry into the formal educational system and the commencement of Torah study. A yarmulke and tzitzis will now be worn, and the child will be taught to pray and read the Hebrew alphabet. So that Torah should be "sweet on the tongue," the Hebrew letters are covered with honey, and the children lick them as they read.

Sometimes the hair that is cut off in the upsherin ceremony is weighed, and charity is given in that amount. If the hair is long enough, it may be donated to a charity that makes wigs for cancer patients.

Other customs include having each of those attending the ceremony snip off a lock of hair, and encouraging the child to put a penny in a tzedakah box for each lock as it is cut. Sometimes the child sings a Hebrew song based on the Biblical verse: "Torah tzivah lanu Moshe, morashah kehilat Yaakov" ["Moses commanded the Torah to us, an eternal heritage for the congregation of Jacob" (Deut 33:4).

Among some Hasidic sects, such as Skver, Chernobyl, and Gur, the upsherin is held at age two. This custom is based on the tradition that Abraham celebrated his son Isaac's second birthday, hinted at in the Biblical verse: "The child grew and was weaned, and Abraham made a great feast." (Genesis 21:8) Among some sephardic communities, particularly in Jerusalem, the practice (known to them as "chalaka") is performed at age five.

Lag BaOmer upsherins

Cutting hair is not allowed during the time of the Counting of the Omer but is permitted on Lag BaOmer. This is why boys who turned three between Pesach and Lag BaOmer celebrate upsherin on this date. It is customary that at the Lag BaOmer celebrations by the tomb of Rabbi Shimon bar Yochai in Meron, Israel, boys are given their first haircuts while their parents distribute wine and sweets. Similar upsherin celebrations are simultaneously held in Jerusalem at the grave of Shimon Hatzaddik for Jerusalemites who cannot travel to Meron.

In 1983 Rabbi Levi Yitzchak Horowitz, the second Bostoner Rebbe, reinstated a century-old tradition among Bostoner Hasidim to light a bonfire and conduct upsherins near the grave of Rabbi Akiva in Tiberias on Lag BaOmer night. The tradition had been abandoned due to murderous attacks on sojourners to that relatively isolated place.

Hasidic interpretation toward Biblical allusion 

In the Bible, human life is sometimes compared to the growth of trees. According to Leviticus 19:23, one is not permitted to eat the fruit that grows on a tree for the first three years. Some Jews apply this principle to cutting a child's hair. Thus little boys are not given their first haircut until the age of three. To continue the analogy, it is hoped that the child, like a tree that grows tall and eventually produces fruit, will grow in knowledge and good deeds, and someday have a family of his own.  Hasidic Rabbis have made this comparison, and in some communities a boy before his first haircut is referred to as orlah, as we refer to a tree in its early years.

Chabad Hasidim have another explanation.
For the first three years of life, a child absorbs the surrounding sights and sounds and the parents' loving care. The child is a receiver, not yet ready to give. At the age of three, children’s education takes a leap—they are now ready to produce and share their unique gifts."

See also 
 First haircut

Notes

External links 
 What is Upsherin? from judaism.about.com
 Upsherin from aish.com
 Upshernish at chabad.org

Lag BaOmer
Yiddish culture
Judaism and children
Rites of passage
Jewish law and rituals
Jewish life cycle
Human hair
Yiddish words and phrases